Tepeš is a Slovenian surname. It may refer to:

Anja Tepeš (born 1991), Slovenian ski jumper; daughter of Miran Tepeš
Jurij Tepeš (born 1989), Slovenian ski jumper; son of Miran Tepeš
Miran Tepeš (born 1961), Slovenian ski jumper and Olympic medalist; father of Anja and Jurij Tepeš

See also
Țepeș (disambiguation)

Slovene-language surnames